Robinia is a genus of flowering plants in the family Fabaceae, tribe Robinieae, native to North America. The leaves are pinnate with 7–21 oval leaflets. The flowers are white or pink, in usually pendulous racemes. Many species have thorny shoots, and several have sticky hairs on the shoots.

The genus is named after the royal French gardeners Jean Robin and his son Vespasien Robin, who introduced the plant to Europe in 1601.

The number of species is disputed between different authorities, with as few as four recognised by some authors, while others recognise up to 10 species. Several natural hybrids are also known.

Some species of Robinia are used as food by caterpillars of Lepidoptera, including such moths as the brown-tail (Euproctis chrysorrhoea), the buff-tip (Phalera bucephala), the engrailed (Ectropis crepuscularia), the giant leopard moth (Hypercompe scribonia), the locust underwing (Euparthenos nubilis), and Gracillariidae leaf miners like Chrysaster ostensackenella, Macrosaccus robiniella and Parectopa robiniella.

Toxicity 

All species produce toxic lectins, throughout the entire plant, with the exception of the flowers.
The flowers are used in teas and in pancakes, and are consumed as fritters in many parts of Europe.

Species 

Robinia hispida – bristly locust
Robinia hispida var. rosea (syn. R. boyntonii)
Robinia hispida var. nana (syns. R. elliottii & R. nana)
Robinia hispida var. kelseyi (syn. R. kelseyi)

Robinia neomexicana (syn. R. luxurians) – New Mexican locust
Robinia pseudoacacia – black locust, false acacia

Robinia viscosa – clammy locust
Robinia viscosa var. hartwegii (syn. R. hartwegii or R. hartwigii)
†Robinia zirkelii

Hybrids 
Robinia × ambigua (R. pseudoacacia × R. viscosa) – Idaho locust
Robinia × holdtii (R. neomexicana × R. pseudoacacia)
Robinia × longiloba (R. hispida × R. viscosa)
Robinia × margarettiae (R. hispida × R. pseudoacacia)

References

External links 
 
 

Robinieae
Fabaceae genera
Melliferous flowers